Jesslyn Fax (January 4, 1893 – February 16, 1975) was a Canadian-American actress. She is known for playing 'Miss Hearing Aid' in Rear Window (1954), Avis Grubb in The Music Man (1962),  Miss Hemphill in The Man Who Died Twice (1958), and Airline passenger in The Family Jewels (1965).

Early years
Fax was born in Toronto, the daughter of Jimmy Fax, a noted Canadian actor and comedian. She began working with her father as a singer, pianist, and monologist when she was 16, then left her father's troupe after five seasons to work in vaudeville and traveling stock companies. She moved to Hollywood in 1949.

Career

A short, cherubic-like character actress, Fax mainly appeared in cheerful small supporting roles as 'little old ladies'. Occasional comic foil to Jack Benny, Lucille Ball, in a guest appearance on I Love Lucy and others. She also made appearances in numerous other popular 1950s-1960s TV shows such as Peter Gunn, Our Miss Brooks, The Jack Benny Program, Alfred Hitchcock Presents, Perry Mason, The Joey Bishop Show, The Man from U.N.C.L.E., The Andy Griffith Show, Gomer Pyle U.S.M.C., and The Wild Wild West. Her film appearances include roles in the Don Knotts films The Ghost and Mr. Chicken (1966) and The Love God? (1969), the Alfred Hitchcock murder/suspense film North By Northwest (1959), which starred Cary Grant, The Music Man (1962), The Family Jewels (1965) with Jerry Lewis and the Andy Griffith film Angel in My Pocket (1969).

Filmography

Films

TV series

Radio series

References

External links

 
 
 
 

1893 births
1975 deaths
Canadian film actresses
Canadian television actresses
People from Old Toronto
20th-century Canadian actresses
Canadian emigrants to the United States